Montserrat Majó (born 26 April 1959 in Manresa, Catalonia) is a Catalan former butterfly swimmer who competed in the 1976 Summer Olympics.

References

1959 births
Living people
Spanish female butterfly swimmers
Olympic swimmers of Spain
Swimmers at the 1976 Summer Olympics
Place of birth missing (living people)
Mediterranean Games bronze medalists for Spain
Mediterranean Games medalists in swimming
Swimmers at the 1975 Mediterranean Games